1939 is a Swedish drama film which was released to cinemas in Sweden on 25 December 1989, directed by Göran Carmback.

Plot
The film is set in Stockholm in 1939 where 18 year old Annika from Värmland comes to work as a waitress girl.

Home video
In 1990, the film was released to VHS by Media Transfer, and to DVD in 2010 as part of the series Svenska klassiker.

Cast

References

External links
IMDB

1989 films
1989 crime drama films
Films directed by Colin Nutley
Films set in 1939
Films set in Stockholm
Swedish drama films
1980s Swedish films